Princess Coup (foaled 2003 in Australia) is a New Zealand thoroughbred racehorse. She is most noted for twice winning the Kelt Capital Stakes,  New Zealand's premier race, in 2007 and 2008. She also won the 2007 New Zealand Oaks and 2008 Stoneybridge Stakes, and ran third in the 2007 Caulfield Cup. She was officially retired in January 2009, with a career record of 12 wins from 33 starts, and NZ$4.2 million in earnings.

References
 5 October 2008 The Australian article titled "Princess Coup heads Tasman raiders"

2003 racehorse births
Racehorses bred in Australia
Racehorses trained in New Zealand
Thoroughbred family 1-n